Main Street Historic District is a federally recognized historic district located at  Millerton in Dutchess County, New York. It includes 65 contributing buildings, seven contributing sites, and one contributing structure. It encompasses the historic commercial core of the village.

It was added to the National Register of Historic Places in 2010.

References

Historic districts on the National Register of Historic Places in New York (state)
National Register of Historic Places in Dutchess County, New York
Historic districts in Dutchess County, New York